The water polo events at the 1991 World Aquatics Championships were held from 3 to 13 January 1991, in Perth, Western Australia.

Medal summary

Medal table

Medalists

References

 
1991
World Aquatics Championships
Water polo